The Michael Nyman Songbook is a collection of art songs by Michael Nyman based on texts by Paul Celan, Wolfgang Amadeus Mozart, William Shakespeare and Arthur Rimbaud. It was recorded as an album with Ute Lemper in 1991, and again as a concert film in 1992, under the direction of Volker Schlöndorff, again with Ute Lemper, though many of the musicians had changed. The songs have been recorded by others and as instrumentals, and are published by Chester Music. The album has been issued by both London Records and Argo Records, though the covers are the same except for the logo.

The Texts
The texts are the poetry of Paul Celan in German, from the collections, Mohn und Gedächtnis (1952), Von Schwelle zu Schwelle (1955), and Sprachgitter (1959), two letters and a 1787 Carnival riddle by Mozart in English for the segment by Jeremy Newsom of Artifax/BBC's Not Mozart titled Letters, Riddles and Writs, Ariel songs from The Tempest composed for Prospero's Books, and L'Orgie Parisienne, ou Paris se Repeuple by Rimbaud. All save the Mozart are performed in their original language.

The Music
The songs are officially written for "low female voice". For Six Celan Songs, Nyman specifically wrote the pieces for Lemper.  "Corona" and "Blume" "introduce an eight-bar chord sequence derived from Chopin's Mazurka in A minor, op. 17 no. 4 (the introduction to which was used by Gorecki in his Symphony No. 3)."  It was composed between May and July 1990. Nyman's mother passed on 7 June, while he was writing "Blume", and he dedicated the cycle to her memory.  "I Am an Unusual Thing" "is based entirely on extracts from two of Haydn quartets" and is from the opera, Letters, Riddles and Writs.  L'Orgie parisienne is an extract from La Traversée de Paris.

The Album
Performed by Michael Nyman, Ute Lemper, and the Michael Nyman Band.

Track listing 

Six Celan Songs (Paul Celan)
1. Chanson einer Dame in Schatten – 6.18
2. Es war Erde in ihnen – 4.12
3. Psalm – 3.35
4. Corona – 6.08
5. Nächtlich geschürzt – 6.27
6. Blume – 5.44

Ariel Songs (Shakespeare)
7. Come and go – 3.15
8. While you here do snoring lie – 1.06
9. Full fathom five – 4.18

10. I am an unusual thing (Mozart) – 5.18

L'Orgie Parisienne (Rimbaud)
11. Allez! on préviendra les reflux d'incendie – 3.18
12. Quand tes pieds ont dansé – 3.24

Credits

Ute Lemper, vocals
Alexander Bălănescu, violin
Elisabeth Perry, violin
Clare Connors, violin
Michael McMenemy, violin
Kate Musker, viola
Tony Hinnigan, cello
Ruth Phillips, cello
Tim Amherst, double bass
Martin Elliott, bass guitar
David Rix, clarinet, bass clarinet
John Harle, soprano, alto saxophone
David Roach, soprano, alto, tenor saxophone
Andrew Findon, baritone saxophone, flute
Graham Ashton trumpet, flugelhorn
Marjorie Dunn, horn
Nigel Barr, bass trombone, euphonium
Michael Nyman, piano
David Cunnigham, producer
Michael J. Dutton, engineer
Chris Brown, assistant engineer
Philippe Garcia, assistant engineer
Ann Bradbeer, art director
David Smart, art director
Don Mousseau, executive producer; artist representative for Michael Nyman
Recorded at Abbey Road Studios, London
Mixed at Kitsch Studios, Brussels
Mastering and editing at Transfermation and at Abbey Road

The album contains only one letter by Mozart, which is musically contiguous with the riddle after the song.

The Film

The film was shot at the Musikhalle, Hamburg, 4 February 1992, before a live audience nearly filling the room to capacity. It includes scenes from such films as Alain Resnais's Night and Fog and Alexander Dovzhenko's Earth.

Ute Lemper
Michael Nyman conductor, piano
Beverley Davidson, violin
Madeleine Mitchell, violin
Ann Morfee, violin
Catherine Musker, viola
Tony Hinnigan, cello
Justin Pearson, cello
Martin Elliott, bass guitar
David Rix, clarinet and bass clarinet
John Harle, soprano and alto saxophone
David Roach, soprano and alto saxophone
Andrew Findon tenor and baritone saxophone, flute, piccolo
Steve Sidwell, trumpet
Marjory Dunn, horn
Nigel Barr, bass trombone and euphonium

The film does not contain the "Ariel Songs", but includes an instrumental prelude, which is "Miranda" from Prospero's Books. It also includes a letter from Letters, Riddles and Writs.

The only cast credits on the film itself are to Ute Lemper and the Michael Nyman Band. The band members are credited (with Marjorie Dunn and Beverley Davison's names misspelled as above) in the order above in a booklet packaged with the videocassette and DVD. The DVD edition is coupled with Ute Lemper Chante Kurt Weill.

See also
Six Celan Songs • The Ballad of Kastriot Rexhepi

References

External links
The Michael Nyman Songbook on IMDb
 
 

1992 classical albums
Michael Nyman albums
Ute Lemper albums